Mezbahuddin Ahmed may refer to:

 Masbah Ahmmed (born 1995), Bangladeshi sprinter
 Mezbahuddin Ahmed (geologist) (1920–2002), Bangladeshi educationalist and geologist